Marko Bašić (born 25 May 1988) is a Croatian footballer who plays for Swiss 1. Liga side Lugano II.

Club career
He had a spell with China League One side Taizhou Yuanda.

On 10 July 2022, Bašić returned to Lugano to play for their reserves team in the fourth-tier Swiss 1. Liga.

Career statistics
.

References

1988 births
Living people
Footballers from Zagreb
Association football midfielders
Croatian footballers
NK Kamen Ingrad players
FC Lugano players
Grasshopper Club Zürich players
Taizhou Yuanda F.C. players
AC Bellinzona players
Swiss Super League players
Swiss Challenge League players
China League One players
Swiss Promotion League players
Swiss 1. Liga (football) players
Croatian expatriate footballers
Expatriate footballers in Switzerland
Croatian expatriate sportspeople in Switzerland
Expatriate footballers in China
Croatian expatriate sportspeople in China